Play Harder is the second extended play by American electronic dance music band Krewella. Billboard magazine describes "Come & Get It" as "[melding] the worlds of complextro and drum and bass" and "[allowing] just enough time for a solid mosh, followed by a brief resting period before running back into the pit".

Track listing
 "Come & Get It"
 "Alive" (Cash Cash & Kalkutta Remix)
 "Alive" (Pegboard Nerds Remix)
 "Alive" (Jakob Liedholm Remix)
 "Killin' It" (Mutrix Remix)
 "Killin' It" (KillaGraham Remix)
 "Killin' It" (Dirtyphonics Remix)
 "Killin' It" (DJ Chuckie Vocal)

Singles

References

2012 EPs
Krewella EPs